Big Bob may refer to:

People
 Robert Brady (criminal) (1904–1934), American bank robber 
 "Big Bob" Carlisle, a regular audience member of the British show Al Murray's Happy Hour
 Bob Hazell (born 1959), Jamaican-born former footballer in the English Football League
 Bob Isbister (1885–1963), Canadian football player
 Bob Johnson (Australian footballer, born 1935) (1935–2001), Australian rules footballer
 Bob Lee (baseball) (1937–2020), American Major League Baseball pitcher
 Bob McLean (Australian footballer) (1914–1989), Australian rules footballer
 Robert Middleton (1911–1977), American actor
 Big Bob Windham, a ring name, along with Blackjack Mulligan, for professional wrestler Robert Windham (1942–2016)

Fictional characters
 Robert "Big Bob" Belcher, Sr., a character in the animated television series Bob's Burgers
 Robert "Big Bob" Gupt, a character in the British soap opera Hollyoaks
 "Big Bob" Joylove, in the British sketch show Harry Enfield & Chums
 Robert "Big Bob" Pataki, a character in the animated television series Hey Arnold!
 Robert "Big Bob" Paulson, in the novel Fight Club and the film adaptation
 Big Bob, in the children's stories Bobobobs

Other uses
 Big Bob, a sandwich offered by Brazilian fast food chain Bob's
 Big Bob, an outflow channel of Sturgeon Lake (Ontario), Canada
 Big Bob Lake, a lake in Ontario
 Big Bob, a 1954 novel by Georges Simenon
 "Big Bob", a season 3 episode of Rob & Big
 "Big Bob", a song by Bill Frisell from the 1999 album Ghost Town
 Big Bob, the 1962 and 1963 winner of the Lee Steere Stakes Australian Thoroughbred horse race
 Big Bob, name sometimes used to refer to the Bob Semple tank  

Lists of people by nickname